t Brouwerskolkje is a defunct restaurant located in Overveen, Netherlands. It was a fine dining restaurant that was awarded one Michelin star in the period 2006–2008 and two Michelin stars in the period 2009–2012. GaultMillau awarded the restaurant 18.0 out of 20 points.

The head chef was Moshik Roth.

Restaurant 't Brouwerskolkje was a member of Les Patrons Cuisiniers.

The restaurant closed 14 April 2012. Its successor opened in August as  "&samhoud places" in Amsterdam which has since been renamed "&moshik" after the chef.

See also 
List of Michelin starred restaurants in the Netherlands

References

External links 
 

Restaurants in Bloemendaal
Michelin Guide starred restaurants in the Netherlands
Defunct restaurants in the Netherlands